Hunter Simba Football Club is a soccer club based in Tighes Hill, Newcastle NSW formed under the leadership of the Hunter African Communities Council in 2010.

History

Current team 
"As of August 2018"

Achievements / Club Honours 
2012– Under 13's 'D Grade' Grand Final Winners
2013– Under 13's' B Grade' Grand Final Winners
2013– Zone league 3 'Reserves' Grand Final Winners
2013– Zone League 3 Grand Finalists
2014– Under 16's B Grade Grand Final Winners
2014– Zone League 3 Grand Finalists (Minor Premiers')
2017– Zone League 2 1st Grade Grand Final Winners
2018– Zone League 2 1st Grade Grand Final Winners

References

External links
 Hunter Simba FC – Official Site
 Northern NSW Football

Association football clubs established in 2010
Soccer clubs in Newcastle, New South Wales
1966 establishments in Australia
Sports teams in Newcastle, New South Wales